Kaech'ŏn station is a railway station in Kaech'ŏn municipal city, South P'yŏngan province, North Korea, on the Manp'o Line of the Korean State Railway; it is also the starting point of the Kaech'ŏn Line to Sinanju, of the Choyang Colliery Line to Choyang Colliery and the Chunhyŏk Line to Chunhyŏngri.

Kaech'ŏn station is an important station in terms of both passenger and freight trains.

History

The station was opened on 13 May 1916 by the Mitsui Mining Railway, which became the Kaech'ŏn Light Railway  in 1927; the Kaech'ŏn Light Railway was subsequently taken over by the Chosen Government Railway on 1 November 1932.

Services

Five long-distance passenger services stop at Kaech'ŏn station: express trains between Haeju and Manp'o and between P'yŏngyang and Hŭich'ŏn, semi-express trains between Sinŭiju and Ch'ŏngjin, and a long-distance stopping train between Sinŭiju and Hŭich'ŏn. Further, there are four pairs of daily commuter trains between Sunch'ŏn and Kaech'ŏn.

References

Railway stations in North Korea
Kaechon
Railway stations opened in 1916